The Dakota Territorial Supreme Court was the highest court of the Dakota Territory, then an organized incorporated territory of the United States. It was the first Territorial Supreme Court in American history, and was established under Article One of the United States Constitution, with justices were appointed directly by the President of the United States. The court sat in Yankton, South Dakota, and existed from March 2, 1861 to November 2, 1889. The first court consisted of three justices: Philemon Bliss, Lorenzo P. Williston, and Joseph Lanier Williams, appointed by President Abraham Lincoln. The court heard no cases until December 3, 1867. In 1879 the court enlarged to four justices, then six in 1884, and eight in 1888.

Justices
Following is a list of justices of the Dakota Territorial Supreme Court,  this was that existed. When the final extent of the reduced territory was split and admitted to the Union as the states of North and South Dakota, the court was abolished by operation of law, and its function was taken over by the North Dakota Supreme Court and the South Dakota Supreme Court.

References

Dakota Territory judges

Courts and tribunals established in 1861
Courts and tribunals disestablished in 1889